Hautman is a surname. Notable people with the surname include:

Jim Hautman, American painter, brother of Joe and Robert
Joe Hautman (born 1956), American painter
Pete Hautman (born 1952), American writer
Robert Hautman, American painter

See also
Hartman